Jemal Emmanuel Le Grand (born 30 June 1994 in Oranjestad) is an Aruban swimmer who competed in the 2012 Summer Olympics – Men's 100m freestyle. He was Aruba's flag bearer at the 2012 Summer Olympics. He also competed at the 2013 World Aquatics Championships.

Jemal lives in the United States.

References

External links

Aruban male freestyle swimmers
1994 births
Living people
Olympic swimmers of Aruba
Swimmers at the 2012 Summer Olympics
People from Oranjestad, Aruba